The Knight XV is a hand-built luxury SUV, produced by Conquest Vehicles since 2008.

History
William Maizlin, an executive specializing in the armored-vehicle industry, undertook to convert a vehicle based on military designs into a luxury armored civilian vehicle and in 2008, Conquest Vehicles was formed.  Working with automotive designers, engineers, and armoring experts, Conquest Vehicles coordinated the research, development and production of the Knight XV.

Design

The Knight XV was unveiled by Conquest Vehicles in 2008 at the Specialty Equipment Market Association (SEMA) in Las Vegas Nevada. The XV stands for "Extreme Vehicles". The vehicle takes approximately 4,000 hours to build at the production facility in Toronto, Ontario, Canada.

The manufacturer offers upgrades and options including a built-in oxygen survival kit, an under-vehicle magnetic attachment detection system, multiple armor levels, and a black box system. The Knight XV is armored using ballistic steel, with ballistic fiberglass fenders and bumper.

The vehicle holds  of fuel and sits on four ballistic run-flat tyres. The vehicle's  are custom-designed and engineered using a solid piece of forged 6061 aluminum.

Performance packages are available for both engine types.

Armor

All glass meets various ballistic levels and is certified according to H.P. White's Quality Control Standards. Glass intended for a client's vehicle is inspected upon receipt and is compared to the test samples for confirmation of both lay-up and the optical zebra test.

The bullet is fired electronically through a military quality barrel with the projectile then passing through a chronograph beam to ensure that it meets the requirements of the ballistic testing standards. The armor-testing samples are maintained at an ambient temperature for 24 hours prior to testing. Samples are removed from each mill lot of armor plate prior to installation on a vehicle and are tested in accordance with the established norms. Upon satisfactory testing, a Certificate of Quality is issued for each sheet.
 Opaque Armor – High quality high-strength steel, ballistic aluminum, composites, aramid and ceramics are used in the manufacturing of the vehicles opaque armor.
 Doors – Due to the added weight of the transparent and opaque armor in the doors, the door hinges are reinforced using a proprietary system designed by the company to completely avoid hinge failure and prevent sheet metal fatigue around the hinge system.
 Armoring Certification – All armoring materials on the KNIGHT XV have been H.P. White Laboratory Inc. certified.
Official specifications on the Knight XV's body armor are not available on the company's website, and no actual armor rating has been issued. The rating for the glass used in the Knight XV's windows is CEN Euronorm B4+, which will stop standard ammunition for most handguns up to and including .44 caliber.

Interior
Among the features are; luxury carpeting; leather; custom flat screen television and a TracVision satellite system; Indirect  LED lighting; AM, FM, CD, DVD; navigation; Bluetooth equipment and overhead tandem sunroof; TV Monitors; Night vision and rear op camera system with a PlayStation 3 or Xbox personal digital entertainment.

The cabin's interior is larger than other SUVs, with an optional intercom communication system and an automatic window-tinting system.

Seating
The standard seating configuration consists of 6 seats (2 in the front and 4 in the rear), with 2 seats facing forward and 2 seats facing backward.

Exterior features
 Rims KNIGHT XV 20-inch (51 cm) polished custom wheels, forged from 6061 aluminum
 Tires: MPT Continental
 Lights: Fascia-mounted PIAA dual-mode fog and driving lamps
 Antenna: Rear-mount
 Bumpers: Front steel, rear ballistic fiberglass (with Kevlar)
 Fenders: Ballistic fiberglass (with Kevlar)

Options
Some production and design options include a supercharger package and commercial grade multi-link air ride suspension system and a right-hand drive conversion package.

References

External links 

 Knight XV at Conquest Vehicles official homepage
 Autoguide.com announces new specs on Knight XV

Cars of Canada
Luxury sport utility vehicles
Full-size sport utility vehicles
Expanded length sport utility vehicles
Cars introduced in 2008